Bahrain International Airport  (romanized: Maṭār al-Baḥrayn al-dwalī) is the international airport of Bahrain. Located on Muharraq Island, adjacent to the capital Manama, it serves as the hub for the national carrier Gulf Air. The airport is managed by the Bahrain Airport Company. Established in 1927, it is the Persian Gulf's oldest international airport.

The airport has recently undergone a $1.1 billion expansion which launched on the 28th of January 2021, boosting the airport's capacity to 14 million passengers annually.

History

Origins
The origins of Bahrain's international airport dates to 1927 when a chartered flight to Bahrain landed. The first scheduled commercial airliner to arrive in Bahrain, in 1932, was a flight from London to Delhi operated on a Handley Page H.P.42 aircraft named Hannibal. The H.P.42 carried only 24 passengers, and the flight from London had taken several days of flying at speeds of 100 miles per hour. Through this regularly scheduled service, Bahrain became established as one of the Persian Gulf's first international airports.

During World War II, the airport was used by the United States Army Air Forces Air Transport Command Central African Wing, being designated as Station # 13. It functioned as a stopover en route to Abadan Airport, Iran or Sharjah Airport, in present-day UAE on the Karachi-Cairo route. From 1943 until Bahrain's independence in December 1971, the Royal Air Force maintained a military installation at the airfield known initially as RAF Bahrain and from 1963 as RAF Muharraq. The majority of these facilities were later acquired by the Bahraini flag carrier airline, Gulf Air, while a small portion continues to be utilized by the U.S. Navy as Aviation Support Unit (ASU) Bahrain.

20th century 
 

In 1936, the operation of H.P.42 aircraft from London to India via Bahrain had been stepped up to a twice-weekly frequency. In 1937, Bahrain saw the regular service of the Empire sea planes. The landing strip of these giants on the water was from where the marina club is located in Mina Salman today. From the 1950s, BOAC operated several services a week through Bahrain. These included weekly services to Karachi, Singapore, Hong Kong and three times a week to Sydney. 1950 was a significant year not only for Muharraq as an international airport, but also for Bahrain's own commercial aviation history. In this year, a new local airline, Gulf Aviation Company, was formed – the forerunner of Gulf Air. The company started with only one aircraft, a second-hand Anson Mark II, which was used initially on services to Dhahran. However, within two years, the fleet had expanded to four de Havilland aircraft and DC-3s for use on a steadily growing network in the Persian Gulf. This established Bahrain as an international stage. It was easily the most modern and advanced airport in the Persian Gulf with a good runway, control tower, lighting, communication facilities and even restaurants. It began to attract other carriers such as Middle East Airlines, Air India, Air Ceylon and Iran Air – mostly operating Dakotas. In December 1961, a new passenger terminal opened at the airport. During 1970–1971, RAF Muharraq was scaled back and eventually closed. In December 1971, the airport opened new passenger facilities, which included a wide area that could accommodate four 747 aircraft. In 1976, the airport marked another significant first with the inauguration of supersonic flights, which saw the start up of regular BA Concorde service between London and Bahrain.

In the 1980s and 1990s, major facelifts took place and several major airline companies made the airport a destination. In 1994, a US$100 million terminal was inaugurated which boosted the airport's maximum capacity to 10 million passengers a year. Moreover, the Bahrain airport possessed a nonstop link to North America for a brief period in the 1990s. Gulf Air operated Airbus A340s on a route to New York's JFK Airport. Due to the constraints of the aircraft, pilots occasionally had to make a refuelling stop on the flight to America.

21st century expansion

In 2008, the airport was placed under management of the newly created Bahrain Airport Company, which falls under the umbrella of the Gulf Air Holding Company, which in turn is owned by Mumtalakat, Bahrain's sovereign wealth fund.

On October 8, 2009, it was announced that BHD 1.8 billion expansion of Bahrain International Airport will start in 2010. The expansion, planned over the next 30 years, will triple the passenger capacity to 27 million a year.

The airport's new $1.1 billion terminal opened on 28 January 2021. At 210,000 square meters, the Passenger Terminal increases Bahrain International Airport's (BIA) capacity to 14 million passengers and 130,000 air traffic movements per year with a handling capacity of 4,700 bags per peak hour.

The terminal features check-in halls, check-in desks, passport control booths, E-gates, security lanes, a 9,000 sqm duty-free retail space, lounges, food and beverage zones, 24 departure gates, and 7,000 new parking spaces goth at-grade and in multi-story facilities.

Ground Handling 
Bahrain Airport Services (BAS) provides airport services at Bahrain International Airport (BIA). Supported by a 3,000-strong staff, BAS is an ISAGO accredited Ground Service Provider.

Aircraft Fueling 
Overseeing the Kingdom's oil, gas, and petroleum assets, Bahrain Jet Fuel Company (BJFCO) is a joint-venture between Bahrain Airport Company and the nogaholding. BJFCO is currently constructing a fuel farm complex in the northeastern area of the airport as part of a major restructuring of the Kingdom's aviation fueling industry.

Ground transportation
The airport is situated in central Muharraq and has transportation connections with the capital city Manama through the Airport Avenue roadway and Shaikh Isa Causeway.

Bahrain International Airport is served 24/7 by several taxi operators.

Bahrain Public Transport Company (BPTC) provides buses.

Cargo & Logistics 
Through BIA's 25,000 sqm Cargo Terminal, a wide range of services are offered, including export cargo sales, transshipment, inter-airport trucking, and customs clearance.

BIA is also the regional hub for DHL. With 115 weekly flights, and 250 vehicles, DHL operates an integrated air and land network. Other cargo and logistics companies operating out of the airport include FedEx, TNT Express, Aramex, and Global Logistical Services (GLS).

Airlines and destinations

Passenger

Cargo

Statistics

Traffic figures

Busiest routes

Accidents and incidents
 On 9 September 1973, British Overseas Airways Corporation Flight 7755, a Vickers VC10, flying from Bombay (now Mumbai) to London via Bahrain and Beirut was hijacked after departing Bahrain and forcibly landed at Dawson's Field in Jordan. The hijacking was done by a Popular Front for the Liberation of Palestine sympathizer who wanted to influence the British government to free Leila Khaled.
 In August 2000, a Gulf Air plane (Gulf Air Flight 072) from Cairo crashed when landing at the airport. All passengers and crew died.
 In August 2017, an American F-18 fighter jet crash landed at the airport, with the pilot safely ejecting.

See also
 List of airports in Bahrain
 Transport in Bahrain

References

External links

 
 Lisy of Bahrain Airspace ( Entry / Exit Points )

Buildings and structures in Manama
Airports in Bahrain
Airports established in 1932
Airfields of the United States Army Air Forces
Airfields of the United States Army Air Forces Air Transport Command in the Middle East
World War II airfields in Bahrain